The Burlington Post is the local newspaper of Burlington, Ontario, Canada.

The paper covers local news and issues, as well as sports, entertainment, the arts, business, and classified sections.

The Post is distributed once a week, on Thursdays, through home delivery and is also sold in local stores and in newspaper boxes.

See also
List of newspapers in Canada

External links
Official site

Burlington Post
Burlington, Ontario
Torstar publications
Publications with year of establishment missing